The Thirteen Classics is a term for the group of thirteen classics of Confucian tradition that became the basis for the Imperial Examinations during the Song dynasty and have shaped much of East Asian culture and thought.
It includes all of the Four Books and Five Classics but organizes them differently and includes the Classic of Filial Piety and Erya.

List 
The classics are, in approximate order of composition:
 Classic of Changes or I Ching (易經 Yìjīng)
 Book of Documents (書經 Shūjīng)
 Classic of Poetry (詩經 Shījīng)
 The Three Ritual Classics (三禮 Sānlǐ)
 Rites of Zhou (周禮 Zhōulǐ)
 Ceremonies and Rites (儀禮 Yílǐ)
 Book of Rites (禮記 Lǐjì)
 The Three Commentaries on the Spring and Autumn Annals
 The Commentary of Zuo (左傳 Zuǒzhuàn)
 The Commentary of Gongyang (公羊傳 Gōngyáng Zhuàn)
 The Commentary of Guliang (穀梁傳 Gǔliáng Zhuàn)
 The Analects (論語 Lúnyǔ)
 Classic of Filial Piety (孝經 Xiàojīng)
 Erya (爾雅 Ěryǎ), a dictionary and encyclopedia
 Mencius (孟子 Mèngzǐ)

History

The tradition of a defined group of "classics" in Chinese culture dates at least to the Warring States period, when the Zhuangzi has Confucius telling Laozi "I have studied the six classics—the Odes, the Documents, the Rites, the Music, the  Changes, and the Spring and Autumn Annals".  These six works were thus already considered classics by at least the 3rd century BC, although the Classic of Music did not survive the chaos of the Qin unification of China and was deemed lost during the Han dynasty.  The remaining Five Classics were traditionally considered to have been edited by Confucius. Records from the late Han and Three Kingdoms period reference "seven classics", though they do not name them individually.  By the Tang dynasty references to "nine classics" were common, though the nine works themselves vary depending on the source.  The Kaicheng Stone Classics (833–837) comprise twelve works (all the above except the Mencius).  By the time of the Southern Song dynasty, the number and specific books in the "thirteen classics" were universally established.  The Thirteen Classics formed the texts used in the Imperial examinations, and their 600,000+ characters, in effect words, were generally required to be memorized in order to pass.

See also 
 Ruzang
 Four Books and five classics 
 Imperial Examinations

References

Further reading 

 
Chinese classic texts
Confucian texts
Series of Chinese books